Chitradurga Assembly constituency is one of the seats in Karnataka Legislative Assembly in India. It is part of Chitradurga Lok Sabha seat.

Members of Assembly 

 1957 : G. Sivappa (INC)
 1962 : H. C. Boraiah (INC) 
 1967 : H. C. Boraiah (INC)
 1972 : C. R. Mohammad Saifuddin (INC)
 1978 : V. Masiyappa (INC(I))
 1983 : B. L. Gowda (Janatha Party)
 1985 : H. Ekanthaiah (Janatha Party)
 1989 : H. Ekanthaiah (JD)
 1994 : G.H. Thippareddy (IND)
 1999 : G.H. Thippareddy (IND)
 2004 : G.H. Thippareddy (INC)
 2008 : Basavarajann (Basanna) (JDS)
 2013 : G.H. Thippareddy (BJP)

Election results

1967 Assembly Election
 H. C. Boraiah (INC) : 23,906 votes    
 V. T. R. Reddy (PSP) : 16,970

2013 Assembly Election
 G.H.Thippareddy (BJP) : 62,228 votes  
 Basavarajan (Basanna) (JD-S) : 35510 votes

See also 
 List of constituencies of Karnataka Legislative Assembly

References 

Assembly constituencies of Karnataka
Chitradurga district